William Henry Furness III (August 10, 1866 – August 11, 1920) was an American physician, ethnographer and author from Philadelphia, Pennsylvania. He made multiple trips to the South Pacific, and was among the first to study and photograph the Kayan people of Borneo and the Wa'ab people on the island of Yap.

Biography

Furness was the grandson and namesake of Unitarian theologian William Henry Furness, and the son of Shakespearean scholar Horace Howard Furness. He attended St. Paul's School (Class of 1883) and Harvard University (Class of 1888), and graduated from the University of Pennsylvania Medical School in 1891. He was one of the medical students portrayed in the Thomas Eakins painting The Agnew Clinic.

Furness made four expeditions to Southeast Asia and Oceania between 1895 and 1901, accompanied by Hiram M. Hiller, Jr. and Alfred C. Harrison, Jr. The trio collected ethnographic, archaeological, and skeletal material, and Furness and Harrison took photographs. These artifacts were among the founding collections of the University of Pennsylvania Museum of Archaeology and Anthropology. Zoological specimens – mostly fish and birds – were donated to the Academy of Natural Sciences of Philadelphia. Duplicate objects were donated to the Peabody Museum of Archaeology and Ethnology at Harvard University.

He returned to the South Pacific in 1903, and spent two months among the Wa'ab people on the island of Uap (Yap). He wrote about their use of rai stones – doughnut-shaped limestone discs – as money. As a coral island, Uap had no natural stone, and most of the rai came from Palau, an island some 280 miles (450 k) away. A rai with a diameter of about 1 foot (30.5 cm) was enough to purchase a full-grown pig, but some had diameters as large as 12 feet (3.66 m).

Rai was a currency that represented genuine labor – it had to be mined and carved on Palau, transported hundreds of miles by outrigger canoe or raft, and on Uap a team of twenty men was required to move the largest ones about. Utilizing a phonograph, Furness recorded Wa'ab speech and native songs, and published the first Uapese-to-English/English-to-Uapese dictionary.

Furness served as curator of the University of Pennsylvania Museum's general ethnology section, 1903-05. At home in Wallingford, Pennsylvania, he raised chimpanzeees and orangutans, and experimented with teaching them rudimentary human speech:

If these animals have a language it is restricted to a very few sounds of a general emotional signification. Articulate speech they have none and communication with one another is accomplished by vocal sounds to no greater extent than it is by dogs, with a growl, a whine, or a bark. They are, however, capable to a surprising degree of acquiring an understanding of human speech.

Honors
Furness was elected a member of the American Philosophical Society (1897), a fellow of the Royal Geographical Society (1898), and a fellow of the Royal Anthropological Institute of Great Britain and Ireland (1902).

Personal

An 1894 article in The Oregonian described Furness as "the most artistically tattooed man in the world." It reported that during a long trip to Japan, he had been heavily tattooed: "[A] splendid representation of the Goddess of Love covers his chest, and the God of Thunder illuminates his back. Snakes and birds by the dozen mark his arms and thighs. A pagoda is designed on one shoulder and a fearful and wonderful collection of geometrical designs covers the other shoulder. A Chinese boat is tattooed on one leg, and a dragon looks from the other."

His expeditions were underwritten by his father – his late mother had been heiress to an iron-making fortune and his father was a successful author. He never married, and lived at "Lindenshade," his parents' house in Wallingford. He provided some of the illustrations for the book String Figures and How to Make Them (1906), by his sister, ethnologist Caroline Furness Jayne. Following the deaths of Caroline in 1909 and her husband Horace Jayne in 1913, their teenage children – Kate Furness Jayne and Horace H. F. Jayne – lived with him at "Lindenshade."

During World War I, he served as a captain in the U.S. Army Medical Corps and organized distribution of medical supplies. He donated the land for the Helen Kate Furness Free Library in Wallingford, named for his mother. He began collecting and editing his father's letters, but ill health forced him to abandon the project. It was completed by his nephew Horace.

He is buried at Laurel Hill Cemetery in Philadelphia in the Furness family plot, Section T, Lot 7.

Works

 "Glimpses of Borneo," Proceedings of the American Philosophical Society, vol. 35 (1897).
 Life in the Luchu Islands (Philadelphia: 1899).
 Folk-Lore in Borneo: A Sketch (Wallingford, Pennsylvania: 1899).
 The Home-Life of Borneo Head-Hunters: Its Festivals and Folk-Lore (Philadelphia: J. B. Lippincott Company, 1902).
 (Co-authored with H. M. Hiller, Jr.) Notes of a Trip to the Veddahs of Ceylon (London, 1902).
 "The Stone Money of Uap, West Caroline Islands," Transactions of the Department of Archaeology, University of Pennsylvania Museum, vol. 1, no. 1 (1904).
 The Island of Stone Money, Uap of the Carolines (Philadelphia: J. B. Lippincott Company, 1910).
 "A Visit to a Head-Hunter of Borneo, 1901," The World's Story: A History of the World in Story, Song and Art, Volume 1: China, Japan, and the Islands of the Pacific (Boston: Houghton Mifflin, 1914).
"Observations on the Mentality of Chimpanzees and Orang-utans," Proceedings of the American Philosophical Society, vol. 55, no. 3 (April 1916).

Gallery

References
 Adria H. Katz, "Borneo to Philadelphia: The Furness-Hiller-Harrison Collections," Expedition Magazine, vol. 30, no. 1, (Spring 1988).

External links

Furness, Harrison and Hiller expedition records from University of Pennsylvania Archives.
Oceania Section from University of Pennsylvania Museum.
Objects donated by William H. Furness 3rd from Online Collection, University of Pennsylvania Museum.

1866 births
1920 deaths
Furness family
Physicians from Philadelphia
People from Delaware County, Pennsylvania
United States Army Medical Corps officers
American explorers
American ethnographers
Burials at Laurel Hill Cemetery (Philadelphia)
Ethnography
Writers from Philadelphia
St. Paul's School (New Hampshire) alumni
Harvard University alumni
Perelman School of Medicine at the University of Pennsylvania alumni
Headhunting accounts and studies
Members of the American Philosophical Society
Fellows of the Royal Geographical Society
Members of the Philadelphia Club